Earl Pierce Finch (October 27, 1830June 11, 1888) was an American lawyer, Democratic politician, and Wisconsin pioneer.  He was the 33rd speaker of the Wisconsin State Assembly, and represented the city of Oshkosh.

Biography

Born in the town of Jay, Essex County, New York, Finch graduated from Union College in 1856. He moved to Menasha, Wisconsin in 1856 and then settled in Oshkosh, Wisconsin. He practiced law and was involved with the Democratic Party. In 1883, Finch served in the Wisconsin State Assembly and was speaker of the Assembly. Finch died from a stroke at his home in Oshkosh, Wisconsin.

References

External links
 

1830 births
1888 deaths
People from Essex County, New York
People from Menasha, Wisconsin
Politicians from Oshkosh, Wisconsin
Union College (New York) alumni
Wisconsin lawyers
19th-century American politicians
19th-century American lawyers
Democratic Party members of the Wisconsin State Assembly